Delyric Oracle is an activist, hip hop artist, author and mogul from New York City.

Early life 
Delyric Oracle spent her early years traveling between continents often, she has said that Tupac Shakur and KRS One raised her, while Hip Hop culture in one country to the next was the only cultural norm she knew. Delyric wound up coming back to Arizona on a semi-permanent basis a few years ago, feeling "called" to the Hip Hop scene. This is where an experience not specified took her to "hell and back" with clear vision and insight. Hence the name, which was taken from Delphic Oracle {also see: Oracle of Delphi, Oracle of Apollo who was said to have had visions gifted by the Gods that came out in iambic pentameters}.

Activism and writings 

Delyric Oracle has won awards for her humanitarianism and charitable works; including working with the Arizona Women's Partnership, and raising awareness for several causes including Black Lives Matter and the NBBP.

Musical career 
Within a year, Delyric Oracle grew to have a large following in both the music and the activism communities, gaining a verified Facebook and Spotify account. She has headlined with Young Sam and The Finatticz Soldier Hard, and has projects coming up with Demetrius Wick of the Horseshoe Gang, a subdivision of Shady Records; Spice One of Tupac fame; and she has a song out with Young Noble of the Outlawz and Bossolo which was received well during its release on Nerve DJs. She took an ill-conceived year off to join her partner Adam Young in working for Dr. Dre's estranged son and aid him in starting his own label. According to several sources that was not an ideal work environment, and most of his team quit shortly after Delyric Oracle, followed several months later by her partner quit. She put all of her energy into the creation of her own label, and Delyric Entertainment was born. It has since grown to incorporate Adam Young, Djayy Charliee, Dj King Assassin (Tupac's DJ and Producer and representative for his estate), Sun of Hollywood (former TMZ photog and celebrity pal PR Giant), and several others. Delyric has upcoming projects with Vee Tha Rula (of Alumni) and Soldier Hard (of Redcon One). She was also recently publicly signed to Mack Drama Records and 1017 Bricksquad Mafia SW.

CES 2018 
In 2018, alongside the launching of her co-hosting career helping co-host occasionally on Current Events Radio 93.9FM KWSS every Monday to Thursday, and hosting Hip Hop Fridays on the same channel every Friday, Delyric Oracle performed at CES in front of over 150,000 attendees after being announced alongside other celebrities on the all star roster for the consumer technology show's annual Las Vegas three-day event.

References 

American activists
American writers
American hip hop musicians
Living people
Musicians from New York City
Year of birth missing (living people)